Gummaregula (Telugu: గుమ్మరేగుల) is a village in Rowthulapudi Mandal, Kakinada district in the state of Andhra Pradesh in India.

Geography 

Demographics 
 India census, Gummaregula had a population of 1435, out of which 740 were male and 695 were female. Population of children below 6 years of age were 155. The literacy rate of the village is 60.08%.

References 

Villages in Rowthulapudi mandal